The Jerry West Shooting Guard of the Year Award is an annual basketball award given by the Naismith Memorial Basketball Hall of Fame to the top men's collegiate shooting guard. The award is named after former Los Angeles Lakers shooting guard, Jerry West. Following  the success of the Bob Cousy Award which had been awarded since 2004, the award was one of four new awards (along with the Julius Erving Award, Karl Malone Award and Kareem Abdul-Jabbar Award) created as part of the inaugural College Basketball Awards show in 2015. It is named after NBA Finals Champion and NBA Finals MVP player Jerry West. The inaugural winner was D'Angelo Russell.

Winners

Winners by school

References

External links
Official website

Awards established in 2015
College basketball trophies and awards in the United States